Aedes srilankensis, or Verrallina srilankensis, is a species complex of zoophilic mosquito belonging to the genus Aedes. It is endemic to Sri Lanka.

References

External links
Description of a new species of Aedes (Verrallina) from Sri Lanka (Diptera: Culicidae).

srilankensis
Insects described in 1977